Byron Bertram successfully defended his title, defeating Frank Gebert in the final, 6–0, 6–3 to win the boys' singles tennis title at the 1970 Wimbledon Championships.

Draw

Finals

Top half

Bottom half

References

External links

Boys' Singles
Wimbledon Championship by year – Boys' singles